The Clinton Power Station is a nuclear power plant located near Clinton, Illinois, USA. The power station began commercial operation on November 24, 1987 and has a nominal net electric output of 1062 MWe. Due to inflation and cost overruns, Clinton's final construction cost was $4.25 billion ($ today), nearly 1,000% over the original budget of $430 million and seven years behind schedule.

The station has a single generation II General Electric Boiling Water Reactor. The present reactor operating license was issued April 17, 1987, and will expire September 29, 2026. Plans for a second reactor were shelved.  Exelon, the former owner and operator of the present reactor, announced plans to permanently close the power station in June 2017, due to the plants struggles to compete economically in wholesale markets, resulting in a loss of millions of dollars in recent years. The plans for closure were canceled, however, when the Illinois State Legislature passed and the Illinois Governor signed SB 2814, The Future Energy Jobs Bill.  The legislation provides Zero Emission Credits for the plants' -free electricity.  The consequences of continued operation include saving 4,200 jobs and the annual generation of 22 billion kWhs of -free energy.

The surrounding  site and adjacent  cooling reservoir, Clinton Lake, is owned by the operator, but hosts the Clinton Lake State Recreation Area and is open to public for a large range of outdoor activities.

Electricity Production

Transfer of ownership to Exelon 
There were a number of problems during the first several years of operation. For example, the facility was down for maintenance frequently and was out of service for almost half of the time from September 1988 to October 1989. In 1997, it was also said to be producing "some of the highest electric rates in the midwest". After less than a decade of operation the plant's original owner, Illinois Power, had to close it in 1996 following some technical problems and safety violations resulting in a $450,000 fine.

Having deduced that it was not economical to own and operate only one nuclear generating station in the newly deregulated market, they kept it shut down during around 3 years whilst looking for an interested buyer.  Exelon Corporation bought it for a more modest price of $40 million, with the purchase including the fuel in the reactor vessel and responsibility of all the radioactive waste in the spent fuel storage pool. The Operator and Owner is the Constellation Energy following its spin-off from Exelon.

Soon after acquiring the power plant, Exelon made in 2001 a request to uprate its power by 20%, from 2894 MWt to 3473 MWt, resulting in an increase of 193 MWe, the largest approved by the NRC until 2012.

Production of medical radio-isotopes
In January 2010, GE-Hitachi announced that the station will begin producing cobalt-60.  The technology is soon to be installed at the Clinton boiling water reactor during Clinton's planned maintenance and refueling outage in order to produce cobalt-60. The radioactive isotope is used for a variety of medical and industrial purposes including cancer therapy, sterilization of medical equipment, food irradiation and materials testing.

It is produced by inserting a 'target' rod rich in non-radioactive cobalt-59 into a reactor core where free neutrons will be captured, turning cobalt-59 into cobalt-60. After retrieval from the core, processing can extract the cobalt-60 for manufacture into a useful radiation source. The vast majority of the world's cobalt-60 supply - over 80% - has traditionally come from Canada's National Research Universal (NRU) reactor at Chalk River. In general, the supply situation for medical and industrial isotopes is shaky thanks to a reliance on this kind of aging research reactor.  Clinton will be the only light water reactor currently producing cobalt-60.

Exelon Nuclear president Charles Pardee said: "We view this as an opportunity for Exelon to support an important medical technology that saves people's lives."

It was announced in September 2011 that GE-Hitachi Nuclear Energy and Exelon commissioned a feasibility study into creating Molybdenum-99 (Mo-99) at the reactor. Mo-99 decays to produce technetium-99m (Tc-99m) that is used in around 50 million medical diagnostic imaging procedures every year. With a half-life of only six hours, Tc-99m is too short-lived to be transported to hospitals so is produced where it is needed in generators containing Mo-99. As Mo-99 itself has a half-life of only 66 hours, the world needs reliable, steady supplies of the isotope, most of which is made by irradiating uranium-235 targets inside a research reactor.

Most of the world's Mo-99 comes from only five research reactors: Canada's NRU, the Netherlands' HFR, Belgium's BR-2, France's Osiris and South Africa's Safari-1. Issues at some of the reactors in recent years have led to worldwide problems with the supply of this vital isotope.

Future plans
In September 2003, Exelon submitted an Early Site Permit to place a second reactor at the Clinton site — this was approved March 15, 2007.
The Early Site Permit does not actually grant any type of license to begin building a second reactor, although it offers the operator an avenue to begin the approval process leading to construction and operation of an additional power reactor at the site.  According to the ESP, the new plant design will be of the AP1000 type, although the ESP does not state what gross wattage has been selected.

In June 2016, plans for the second reactor were shelved, and reactor 1 was to be shut down in June 2017. The plant was struggling to compete in wholesale electricity markets, resulting in a loss of millions of dollars in recent years. Shutdown plans were cancelled with the passage of Illinois Senate Bill 2814.

In December 2016, Illinois voted to subsidize Exelon with 1c/kWh or $235 million per year (depending on electricity rates) to keep Clinton and Quad Cities Nuclear Generating Station open for at least 10 years, as natural gas had decreased rates.

In October 2022, Constellation announced they are seeking to extend Clinton’s operating license to 2047.

Surrounding population

The 2010 U.S. population within  of Clinton was 14,677, a decrease of 0.4 percent in a decade, according to an analysis of U.S. Census data for msnbc.com. The 2010 U.S. population within  was 813,658, an increase of 5.7 percent since 2000. Cities within 50 miles include Champaign, Decatur, Bloomington-Normal, as well as portions of Springfield, and the Peoria Metro Area.

Seismic risk
The Nuclear Regulatory Commission's estimate of the risk each year of an earthquake intense enough to cause core damage to the reactor at Clinton was 1 in 400,000, according to an NRC study published in August 2010.

In popular culture
Inspired by the nearby power station, Clinton radio station WHOW changed its motto to "WHOW, your radio active station" in April 1989.

Inspired by the fact that Clinton Lake was created to provide cooling for the nuclear power station the Clinton Lake Sailing Association hosts a popular annual Midwestern regatta known as The Glow In The Dark Regatta. This regatta attracts sailboat racers from all over the country including Florida, Ohio, Minnesota, Wisconsin, Pennsylvania, Maryland, Michigan, and more. In 2018 there were 34 teams registered from 8 states.

Notes

References

Exelon | Clinton Power Station

External links

Energy infrastructure completed in 1987
Buildings and structures in DeWitt County, Illinois
Nuclear power stations with proposed reactors
Nuclear power plants in Illinois
Exelon